Pentaptilon is a genus consisting of a single species—Pentaptilon careyi—in the family Goodeniaceae native to southwestern Australia.

References

Goodeniaceae
Endemic flora of Western Australia
Monotypic Asterales genera
Taxa named by Ernst Pritzel